Nesquehoning may refer to the following places in the U.S. state of Pennsylvania:

Nesquehoning, Pennsylvania, a borough in Carbon County
Nesquehoning High School, in the above borough
Nesquehoning Creek, a tributary of the Lehigh River
Nesquehoning Mountain, also known as Nesquehoning Ridge, a 15-17 mile long coal bearing ridge